The 1963 season was the Minnesota Vikings' third in the National Football League (NFL). Under head coach Norm Van Brocklin, the team finished with a 5–8–1 record. Five wins in a season represented the most in the franchise's three-year history. 22-year-old Paul Flatley of Northwestern University was named the NFL's Rookie of the Year, a first for the fledgling franchise.

Offseason

1963 Draft

 The Vikings traded their sixth-round selection (72nd overall) to the Cleveland Browns in exchange for CB Tom Franckhauser, OT Errol Linden, TE Charley Ferguson and K Fred Cox.
 The Vikings traded their seventh-round selection (87th overall) to the New York Giants for DE/LB Jim Leo.

Roster

Preseason

Regular season

Schedule

Game summaries

Week 2: vs Chicago Bears

Standings

Postseason
For the first time, the Vikings had starters in the East–West Pro Bowl, played January 12, 1964, at the Los Angeles Memorial Coliseum and won by the West squad. Halfback Tommy Mason, linebacker Rip Hawkins and tackle Grady Alderman each were voted to start on the West team coached by the Chicago Bears' George Halas.

Wide receiver Paul Flatley, who led the team in receiving yards and receiving touchdowns, was named as the 1963 Rookie of the Year by the Associated Press (AP), United Press International (UPI) and The Sporting News (TSN).

Halfback Tommy Mason, in his third year, was named first-team All-Pro by the AP, UPI, TSN, the Newspaper Enterprise Association and the New York Daily News.

Middle linebacker Rip Hawkins was named second-team All-Pro by the UPI.

Statistics

Team leaders

League rankings

References

1963
Minnesota
Minnesota Vikings